The  is an electric multiple unit (EMU) train type built in 2010 and operated by Hokkaido Railway Company (JR Hokkaido) on suburban services in the Sapporo area in Hokkaido, Japan, since May 2012.

Design
The 735 series is intended as an experimental type to evaluate the suitability of aluminium-body rolling stock in the cold climate of Hokkaido. The cab ends however use steel construction. They were tested in winter conditions from 2010 to 2011.

The 735 series sets are able to run in multiple with the 721 series, 731 series, and 733 series suburban EMUs, but not with KiHa 201 series DMUs.

Formation
Sets are formed as shown below.

The MoHa 735 car is fitted with an N-PS785 single-arm pantograph.

Interior
The 735 series design continues the basic configuration of the earlier 731 series with longitudinal seating throughout. The floor is  lower than on previous trains, for improved accessibility. Car 1 has a universal access toilet.

History

Two 3-car sets were delivered from the Hitachi factory in Yamaguchi Prefecture in March 2010.

The sets first entered revenue-earning service on 1 May 2012.

References

External links

 JR Hokkaido press release (10 March 2010) 
 JR Hokkaido 735 series (Japan Railfan Magazine Online) 

Electric multiple units of Japan
Train-related introductions in 2012
Hokkaido Railway Company
Hitachi multiple units
Experimental vehicles
20 kV AC multiple units